Yenice is a small village in Gülnar district of  Mersin Province, Turkey. At  it is situated to the southwest of Gülnar. The population of Yassıbağ is  only 51. as of 2012.

References

Villages in Gülnar District